Joseph H. Chadbourne (1883–1958) was an English professional footballer who played as a centre forward. He was born in Halifax, West Riding of Yorkshire and played nine games in the Football League for Burnley, scoring four goals.

References

1883 births
1958 deaths
English footballers
Association football forwards
Bradford City A.F.C. players
Barnsley F.C. players
Burnley F.C. players
English Football League players